The 2014 Wyre Forest District Council election took place on 22 May 2014 to elect members of Wyre Forest District Council in Worcestershire, England. One third of the council was up for election and the council stayed under no overall control.

After the election, the composition of the council was:
Conservative 15
Labour 9
Health Concern 7
UK Independence Party 5
Independent 4
Liberal 2

Background
Between the last election in 2012 and the 2014 election there were several changes in the political composition due to defections. Only weeks after the 2012 election, Offmore and Comberton councillor Rose Bishop defected from the Liberals to the Conservatives, taking the Conservatives to exactly half of the seats on the council, with 21 councillors. However, in May 2013 the Conservative councillor for Aggborough and Spennells, John Aston, left the party to sit as an independent after failing to be backed by the Conservatives for the position of vice chairman of the council. Also in May 2013 the Conservative councillor for Mitton, Mike Salter, left the party to become an independent, and then went on to join Health Concern later that year.

Finally in March 2014, the councillor for Bewdley and Arley Julian Phillips quit the Conservative party to become an independent. These changes meant that before the 2014 election there were 18 Conservative councillors, 9 Health Concern, 8 Labour, 3 Liberals and 3 independents in the Liberal and Independent group, and one other independent councillor.

In April 2014 the council got a new leader after Conservative John Campion resigned and party colleague Marcus Hart was elected to succeed him.

Candidates
14 seats were contested in 2014 with the successful candidates only being elected for one year as the whole council was being elected in 2015 after boundary changes. The Conservatives defended 8 of the 14 seats, with 2 cabinet members standing for re-election, John Campion and Ian Hardiman, while the former Liberal councillor Rose Bishop defended Offmore and Comberton as a Conservative. Of the remaining six seats contested, three were held by Health Concern, with Mike Salter defending Aggborough and Spennells for the party after his move from the Conservatives. However councillor Howard Martin stood in Broadwaters for Labour after originally being elected for Health Concern in 2010.

Independent John Aston stood in Aggborough and Spennells after his move from the Conservatives, while the final seat in Greenhill was held by Liberal Tim Ingham before the election. However Ingham stood in Offmore and Comberton at the 2014 election, leaving Rachel Lewis to defend Greenhill for the Liberal Party.

Meanwhile, the UK Independence Party did not have any seats before the election, but stood candidates for all 14 seats that were contested. They were joined by the Conservatives, Health Concern and Labour in contesting every seat, while the Liberal Party, Green Party, Trade Unionist and Socialist Coalition and an independent contested some of the seats.

Election result
The UK Independence Party gained five seats, to get the party's first councillors on Wyre Forest District Council and they came within 100 votes of overtaking the Conservatives in the share of the vote. The gains came from the Conservatives in Franche and Oldington and Foley Park, from Labour in Broadwaters, in Mitton from Health Concern and in Greenhill from the Liberal Party. Despite losing three seats the Conservative party remained the largest party on the council with 15 councillors, but Conservative cabinet member Ian Hardiman was defeated in Habberley and Blakebrook and the vice-chairman of the council Daniel McCann lost in Franche.

Labour became the second largest party on the council with 9 seats after gaining seats in Habberley and Blakebrook and Areley Kings. However they lost Broadwaters to the UK Independence Party and dropped to fourth in vote share with 18% of the vote. Health Concern lost two seats to have seven councillors but won the third most votes, while the Liberals lost a seat in Greenhill to have two councillors. Finally John Aston held Aggborough and Spennells as an independent, meaning there remained four independents on the council. Overall turnout at the election was 36%.

Following the election the unaffiliated independent councillor Julian Phillips joined the Liberal and Independent group, which then formed an alliance with the Conservatives to control the council. Between the 15 Conservatives, 4 independents and 2 Liberals they controlled exactly half of the seats on the council. Conservative Marcus Hart remained leader of the council, with the leader of the Liberal and Independent group Helen Dyke joining the council cabinet.

Ward results

References

2014
2014 English local elections
2010s in Worcestershire